The house at 52 Eighteenth Avenue is a historic home located at Sea Cliff in Nassau County, New York.  It was built in 1895 and is a two-story clapboard-sided residence with a slate-covered hipped roof in the Late Victorian style.  It features a raised front porch with lattice work and a two-story bay window.

It was listed on the National Register of Historic Places in 1988.

References

Houses on the National Register of Historic Places in New York (state)
Victorian architecture in New York (state)
Houses completed in 1895
Houses in Nassau County, New York
National Register of Historic Places in Nassau County, New York